1587, a Year of No Significance: The Ming Dynasty in Decline is the most famous work of the Chinese historian Ray Huang. First published by Yale University Press in 1981, it examines how a number of seemingly-insignificant events in 1587 might have caused the downfall of the Ming dynasty.

The Chinese title, meaning "the fifteenth year of the Wanli era", is how the year 1587 was expressed in the Chinese calendar; it is the era name of the reigning Chinese emperor at the time, followed by the year of his reign.

Major figures discussed in the book besides the emperor are Grand Secretaries Zhang Juzheng and Shen Shixing, the official Hai Rui, the general Qi Jiguang, and the philosopher Li Zhi.

Although Huang had completed the manuscript by 1976, no publisher would accept it at first, as it was not serious enough for an academic work but was too serious for popular non-fiction.

The work has been translated into a number of different languages: Mandarin, Japanese, Korean, German, and French.

Adaptations
1587 was adapted into a play by the Zuni Icosahedron director Mathias Woo, which premièred in Hong Kong in 1999. The second production was in 2006, after Woo and the Towards the Republic screenwriter Zhang Jianwei (張建偉) had rewritten the script by adding a considerable amount of Kun opera and other elements. There was a third run in 2008.

References

External links
 The Book on Yale University Press
 Review by The New York Times
 專訪﹕《萬曆十五年》編導胡恩威 香港演繹萬曆十五年的傳奇

1981 non-fiction books
20th-century history books
History books about the Ming dynasty
Yale University Press books
1587 in China